John William Kellette (June 1873 – August 7, 1922) was an American songwriter. Kellette's most famous composition was "I'm Forever Blowing Bubbles," which was introduced in the musical revue The Passing Show of 1918, which he wrote with James Brockman, James Kendis, and Nat Vincent.  He also worked as a film director and acted in the films A Child of the Wild (1917) and Mercy on a Crutch (1915).

Filmography
Mercy on a Crutch (1915)
A Child of the Wild (1917), as A Tramp
My Little Sister (1919 film), one of directors credited

References

External links

1873 births
1922 deaths
Songwriters from Massachusetts
Musicians from Lowell, Massachusetts